Adam Mokoka (born 18 July 1998) is a French professional basketball player for the Oklahoma City Blue of the NBA G League. He most recently played for Nanterre 92 of the LNB Pro A. He primarily plays as a shooting guard.

Early career
Mokoka came through the youth academy of BCM Gravelines-Dunkerque. He won the national U21 championship with the BCM in 2014 and 2015.

Professional career

BCM Gravelines-Dunkerque (2015–2018) 
Mokoka made his debut for BCM's men's squad in the French top-flight Pro A during the 2015–16 season. In April 2018, he declared for the 2018 NBA draft. In May 2018, we was named the LNB Pro A Best Young Player, after averaging 3.2 points and 1.7 rebounds over the 2017–18 season.

Mega Bemax (2018–2019) 
On 10 July 2018, Mokoka signed with Serbian club Mega Bemax.

On 12 June 2018, Mokoka withdrew from the 2018 NBA draft on the deadline, rather focusing on the 2019 NBA draft where he (at that time) was considered a second-round draft prospect. In April 2019, he declared for the 2019 draft, but went undrafted.

Chicago Bulls (2019–2021) 
On 2 July 2019, Mokoka signed with the Chicago Bulls to a two-way contract. He moved to the Austin Spurs as a two-way flex-transfer on 27 February 2021.

Nanterre 92 (2021–2022) 
On 25 November 2021, Mokoka was signed by Nanterre 92, thus returning to the French league.

On 12 October 2022, Mokoka was signed by the Oklahoma City Thunder and waived three days later.

Oklahoma City Blue (2022–present)
On 3 November 2022, Mokoka was named to the opening night roster for the Oklahoma City Blue.

National team career
Mokoka was a member of gold-winning French teams at the 2014 U16 and 2016 U18 European Championships. He competed for France in the 2017 FIBA Under-19 Basketball World Cup, averaging 6.4 points a contest.

Career statistics

NBA

|-
| style="text-align:left;"| 
| style="text-align:left;"| Chicago
| 11 || 0 || 10.2 || .429 || .400 || .500 || .9 || .4 || .4 || .0 || 2.9
|-
| style="text-align:left;"| 
| style="text-align:left;"| Chicago
| 14 || 0 || 4.0 || .368 || .100 || .000 || .4 || .4 || .1 || .1 || 1.1
|- class="sortbottom"
| style="text-align:center;" colspan="2"|Career
| 25 || 0 || 6.7 || .404 || .280 || .400 || .6 || .4 || .2 || .0 || 1.9

LNB Pro A

|-
| style="text-align:left;"|2015–16
| style="text-align:left;"|BCM Gravelines-Dunkerque
| 1 || 0 || 1.0 || .000 || .000 || .000 || 0.0 || 0.0 || 0.0 || 0.0 || 0.0
|-
| style="text-align:left;"|2016–17
| style="text-align:left;"|BCM Gravelines-Dunkerque
| 12 || 0 || 6.8 || .368 || .125 || .667 || 0.3 || 0.2 || 0.2 || 0.0 || 1.4
|-
| style="text-align:left;"|2017–18
| style="text-align:left;"|BCM Gravelines-Dunkerque
| 34 || 22 || 14.0 || .345 || .222 || .553 || 1.7 || 0.9 || 0.4 || 0.1 || 3.2
|- class="sortbottom"
| style="text-align:center;" colspan="2"|Career
| 47 || 22 || 7.3 || .357 || .174 || .610 || 1.0 || 0.6 || 0.3 || 0.1 || 2.3

References

External links
 Profile at lnb.fr
 Profile at FIBA

1998 births
Living people
ABA League players
Basketball League of Serbia players
Basketball players from Paris
BCM Gravelines players
Black French sportspeople
Chicago Bulls players
French expatriate basketball people in Serbia
French expatriate basketball people in the United States
French men's basketball players
KK Mega Basket players
Nanterre 92 players
National Basketball Association players from France
Shooting guards
Undrafted National Basketball Association players
Windy City Bulls players